Actias rosenbergii is a moth in the family Saturniidae.

References 

rosenbergii